The National Association of Colored Graduate Nurses was a professional organization for African American nurses founded in 1908.

Foundation

In 1906, Connecticut nurse Martha Minerva Franklin surveyed African American nurses to see what challenges they faced as a group.  Franklin determined that the prestigious American Nurses Association was technically open to African American members, but many State Nurses Associations refused to admit black members.  State-level membership was required to join the American Nurses Association and thus, many qualified African American nurses were barred from full membership in the national association.

In 1908, fifty-two nurses, including Martha Minerva Franklin and Adah Belle Samuels Thoms, met in New York City and decided to start the NACGN.  Franklin was elected president at the first meeting.

As they left the meeting they had three main goals: "to advance the standards and best interests of trained nurses, to break down discrimination in the nursing profession, and to develop leadership within the ranks of black nurses." To do this, the acting presidents of the NACGN not only actively fought for integration by other means but also attended the annual ANA conference to bring awareness to the topic.  In 1912, the NACGN had 125 members.  By 1920, that number has risen to 500.

Adah Belle Samuels Thoms served as the first treasurer of the NACGN before taking over the presidency of the organization in 1916.  Thoms established a national jobs registry to help black nurses find employment and established the association's first headquarters.  During World War I, Thoms campaigned for the American Red Cross to admit African American nurses.  This was important because the American Red Cross was the only avenue into the United States Army Nurse Corps.  According to Jane Delano, chair of the National Committee on Red Cross Nursing service, the Red Cross was willing to admit black nurses, but the Surgeon General was not.  Nurse Frances Reed Elliot was enrolled in the Red Cross in July 1918 but was not immediately assigned.  It took the 1918 flu pandemic and the resulting nurse shortage to finally integrate the United States Army Nurse Corps. In December 1918, eighteen African American nurses were appointed to the United States Army Nurse Corps.  They were assigned to Camp Grant and Camp Sherman with full rank and pay.  Although the patients were not segregated and the nurses were assigned to all services, the African American nurses were housed separately from the white nurses.

Carrie E. Bullock served as NACGN president from 1927 to 1930. Bullock worked to increase communication and community among black nurses.  In 1928, she founded and edited the NACGN's official newsletter, The National News Bulletin.

Mabel Keaton Staupers became the first paid executive secretary of the National Association of Colored Graduate Nurses in 1934.  Stauper's most important accomplishment was the further integration of US military nurses. In 1946, Stauper resigned and her replacement Alma Vessels John was hired. She would shepherd the organization until its dissolution in 1951.

From 1934 to 1939, Estelle Massey Osborne was NACGN's president.

World War II
Initially, the War Department announced that there would be no black nurses called to serve the United States Army Nurse Corps. Staupers and other activists petitioned for the rights of black nurses and served on the NACGN Special Defense Committee. In January 1941, the Army announced a quota of fifty-six black nurses to work at the black military installations at Camp Livingston and Fort Bragg. Staupers continued to campaign for greater inclusion, meeting with Eleanor Roosevelt, white nursing groups, military leaders, and black advocates. By 1943, the number of black nurses serving in the armed forces had increased from 56 to 160. By the end of the war, the War Department was drafting all qualified nurses, regardless of race.

In 1943, Congresswoman Frances P. Bolton (R-OH) introduced a bill to create government grants for nursing programs in order to increase the number of trained nurses available during World War II.  The Bolton Act (1943) forbid discrimination and brought about an increase in the number of black nursing students in the country.

Professional organizations slowly began to increase membership opportunities for black women. In 1942, the National League of Nursing Education changed its by-laws to allow applicants barred from state leagues to directly join the national organization. Follow the national change, several state Leagues of Nursing Education began admitting black members. By the end of World War II there were only 2.9 percent black nurses (compared to blacks making up 10 percent of the population) or eight thousand registered black nurses in the United States.

Integration with the American Nurses Association
During the civil rights movement in the late 1940s and 1950s more nursing schools were accepting black applicants. Estelle Osborne wrote in the Journal of Negro Education that in 1941, 29 United States nursing schools had a nondiscrimination policy and by 1949 that number was up to 354. In 1949, the members of the National Association of Colored Graduate Nurses unanimously voted to accept a proposed merger with the American Nurses Association. NACGN membership voted the NACGN out of existence in 1951.

Notable members
 Carrie E. Bullock
 Frances Reed Elliot
 Martha Minerva Franklin
 Hulda Margaret Lyttle
 Mary Eliza Mahoney
 Petra Pinn
 Mabel Keaton Staupers
 Adah Belle Samuels Thoms

References

American Nurses Association
1908 establishments in the United States
Medical and health organizations based in Maryland
African-American professional organizations
Nursing organizations in the United States